The doctrine of the serpent seed, also known as the dual-seed or the two-seedline doctrine, is a controversial and fringe Christian religious belief which explains the biblical account of the fall of man by stating that the Serpent mated with Eve in the Garden of Eden, and the offspring of their union was Cain. This event resulted in the creation of two races of people: the wicked descendants of the Serpent who were destined for damnation, and the righteous descendants of Adam who were destined to have eternal life. The doctrine frames human history as a conflict between these two races in which the descendants of Adam will eventually triumph over the descendants of the Serpent.

Elements of the teaching appears in the early Gnostic writings of Valentinus (100–160) and the Gospel of Philip. Mainstream Christian teachers rejected the serpent seed doctrine as heresy during the gnostic period. Irenaeus, an Early Church Father, described the gnostic doctrine that the original sin was adultery between Eve and the serpent and explicitly rejected it as heresy in his book Against Heresies. In the middle ages, the concept also appeared in Jewish literature, including the Targum Pseudo-Jonathan.

During the 19th century, the serpent seed doctrine was revived by American religious leaders who wanted to promote white supremacy. The modern versions of the serpent seed doctrine were developed within the teachings of British Israelism by C. A. L. Totten (1851–1908) and Russel Kelso Carter (1849–1928). Daniel Parker (1781–1844) was also responsible for reviving and promoting the doctrine among Primitive Baptists. Teachers of Christian Identity Theology, which branched off from British Israelism, preached the doctrine during the early twentieth century and promoted it within the Ku Klux Klan, Aryan Nations, the American Nazi Party and other white supremacist organizations. The belief's adherents commonly use it to justify antisemitism and racism by claiming that Jews or members of non-white races are the descendants of Cain and the Serpent, who they variably interpret to be Satan or an intelligent non-human creature which lived before Adam and Eve.

The serpent seed teaching comes in several different forms. William M. Branham (1909–1965), Arnold Murray (1929–2014), Wesley A. Swift (1913–1970), and Sun Myung Moon (1920–2012) played important roles in spreading different versions of the doctrine among members of their respective groups throughout the 20th century. Around the world, there are millions of adherents of the serpent seed doctrine within Branhamism and the Unification Church. In 2000, there were an estimated 50,000 adherents of it within Christian Identity. The Anti-Defamation League and various Christian apologetics organizations have denounced racist versions of the serpent seed teaching by claiming that they are incompatible with the teachings of traditional Christianity, and they have accused their promoters of exacerbating racial divisions by spreading hate.

Doctrine
Various nuanced forms of the serpent seed doctrine have been developed over the centuries. In its most prominent modern form, it explains the biblical account of the fall of man by stating that the serpent mated with Eve in the Garden of Eden, and the offspring of their union was Cain. It claims that Eve had relations with Adam a second time, and Abel and his younger brother Seth were the two offspring who were produced by that union. Both of these events resulted in the creation of two races of people, the first event produced the wicked descendants of the Serpent who were destined for damnation, and the second event produced the righteous descendants of Adam who were destined to have eternal life. The doctrine frames human history as a conflict between these two races in which the descendants of Adam will eventually triumph over the descendants of Cain and the Serpent.

Genesis 3:14-15 is a foundational verse for the doctrine.

The doctrine is frequently used to demonize Jews and people who are members of non-white races and justify their mistreatment, abuse, enslavement or elimination by labeling them Satanic and sub-human. Variations of the doctrine claim that the Serpent's descendants have no souls because they are partially descended from animals and are therefore predestined for damnation. Some groups are markedly militant on the subject because of their millennial teachings, and as a result, they believe that at the end of days, a final battle will be fought in which the pure race will triumph over the impure race.

The identity of the serpent varies between groups. Some groups claim that the serpent is Satan himself, while other groups claim that the serpent is an animal which is either apelike or human-like. Some groups incorporate Pre-Adamite views which state that the serpent was a non-human creature whose creation predated the creation of Adam.

The identity of the serpent's seed also varies between groups. Aryan Nations, an American anti-semitic, neo-Nazi and white supremacist group, claims that the descendants of the serpent are all people who are not of northern European descent. Other Christian Identity groups claim that the descendants of the serpent are either Jews or Africans. William Branham connected the serpent's descendants with Ham (the biblical progenitor of the African peoples), several Jewish figures, the highly educated, and society's criminals. Arnold Murray connected the descendants of the Serpent with the "Kenites", a group of people which he believed had infiltrated some part of Jewish society. In the Unification Church, the bloodline of all humanity is believed to be contaminated as a result of Eve's relations with the serpent. However, married couples can change their heritages by performing the Holy Marriage Blessing Ceremony which enables them to become the adopted children of their new Adam: Sun Myung Moon.

Mainstream Christianity
Mainstream Christianity rejects the serpent seed view. Many different Christian groups offer systematic rebuttals of the doctrine. For example, the Christian Apologetics and Research Ministry points to Genesis 4:1 in order to refute the doctrine. Because the biblical record explicitly names Adam as the father of Cain, the teaching of the serpent seed is considered incompatible with the Protestant teaching of Biblical infallibility.

Critics argue that the doctrine foments division and fuels racism, which makes it an unhealthy belief which is incompatible with Christianity because the belief itself leads to sin. One Christian apologetics group states, "Although an idea should not be criticized when it is wrongly applied, it is appropriate to condemn an idea when it logically leads to sin. A philosophy that teaches that some races or people are universally satanic, like the serpent seed doctrine, is one such philosophy." Also writing on the topic, Rev. John Brisby stated, "The Serpent's Seed doctrine is the hallmark of most radical hate groups today. Whether it involves neo-Nazis, right-wing militias, or one of the many other white supremacist groups, most of them share this doctrine in common. How do they justify their hatred towards Jews, non-whites, and others? They believe that these people are not real people at all!"

Other criticisms of the doctrine point out the theological repercussions of blurring traditional Christianity's interpretation of the doctrine of original sin. The serpent seed doctrine characterizes original sin as a feature of genetic inheritance rather than a spiritual condition. Mainstream Christianity teaches the belief that all individuals are the spiritual children of Satan because they were born in a state of original sin. Through the act of Christian conversion, individuals can become children of God through adoption. The serpent seed doctrine undermines the basic teachings of Christian conversion by teaching the belief that only individuals who are descended from Adam are the inherent children of God, a belief which classifies them as the only people who do not need to convert to Christianity, while the Serpent's seedline is irredeemable.

History

Early teachings
Valentinus (100–160) promoted a doctrine which is similar to the serpent seed doctrine because it states that Eve mated with the serpent and produced Cain. In his teaching, the serpent was the manifestation of an aeon named Sophia who seduced Eve. The teachings of Valentinus were compiled in the Gnostic Gospel of Philip where the idea that Eve mated with the serpent, or Satan, and produced Cain, finds its earliest expression. A similar account is recorded in the Gnostic Apocryphon of John which was authored by the Sethians.

Irenaeus recorded a portion of the teaching and denounced it as heresy in his book Against Heresies. Explaining and commenting on the teachings of Valentinus, Irenaeus states:

Medieval Judaism
The teaching also appeared in medieval Judaica. In his 1957 book Cain: Son of the Serpent, David Max Eichhorn traces the belief that Cain was the son of the union between the serpent and Eve back to early Jewish Midrashic texts which were composed between 800 CE and 1200 CE. Eichhorn identified rabbis who wrote about the topic, including a 9th-century book titled Pirke De-Rabbi Eliezer and the Zohar. In their version, Adam's first wife was Lilith and his second wife was Eve. Lilith became possessed by the spirit of God's wife and rebelled against Adam and became the mother of all demons. Eve was subsequently seduced by the serpent and became the mother a race of evil men.

A later folk-version of the serpent seed doctrine was somewhat widespread in European Christianity during the Middle Ages and it ascribed the ancestry of legendary monsters such as Grendel to Cain.

The Aramaic Targum Pseudo-Jonathan contains passages referencing the serpent seed concept. The targum was referenced by Rabbi Menahem Recanati (1250–1310) in his Perush 'Al ha-Torah. The age of the writing is disputed. A 2006 analysis by Beverly Mortensen dates Targum Pseudo-Jonathan to the 4th century and regards it as a manual for kohanim. Gavin McDowell's analyses suggested the document was created in the early 1200s because it includes excerpts from writings from the 1100s.

In Targum Pseudo-Jonathan, the serpent is an angelic being named Samael.

And again, in Targum Pseudo-Jonathan..

So Adam knew his wife Eve/Hava, who desired the Angel (Samael), aka "The Serpent, Satan & The Destroyer" in Judaism & Talmudic Lore. And then she bore Kain. In one account Samael is also believed to be the father of Cain, as well as the partner of Lilith. The relationship between Samael and Lilith is depicted in the Sigil of Baphomet, the official insignia of the Church of Satan.

The serpent seedline doctrine's modern origins in British Israelism

British Israelism reintroduced a version of serpent seed beginning in the mid 1800s. A small circle of ministers in the United Kingdom first began to develop what they called "seedline" doctrine in the 1790s. The seedline teaching stated that two races of people lived upon the earth: a righteous pure seedline of people and an unrighteous impure seedline of people. The early teachings of the seedline doctrine did not offer an origin story for the two groups. The original form of British Israelism taught the belief that the Anglo-Saxons were descended from the lost tribes of Israel and were therefore part of the pure seedline.

British Israelism traces its roots to Richard Brothers (1759–1824) who was one of the earliest promoters of the theology and published a tract on the topic in 1794. John Wilson (1788–1870), and Edward Hine (1825–1891) followed Brothers in promoting the doctrine in the mid-1800s and each of them also published books on the topic and acquired a large following within various Christian denominations. Elements of their teachings gradually became popular among members of the Church of England. Each of them published books on the topic and they also acquired a growing number of followers within various Christian denominations. According to the Anti-Defamation League, the earliest versions of the teaching did not seem to be racially motivated, but that began to change as the theology was introduced in the United States. The theology arrived in the United States through British Israelite evangelists in the mid-19th century. Rev. Joseph Williams (1826–1882), who immigrated from the UK to the USA, was probably the first such evangelist. He lectured on the subject in Boston from 1874 until his death in 1882. His teachings on the subject were published in two periodicals, The Trio and The Trumpet of Israel. Rev. Joseph Wild (1834–1908) immigrated from England to Brooklyn during the 1880s. He became the preeminent American promoter of British Israelism. He published multiple books on the subject and influence many white Americans with his teachings.

Daniel Parker (1781–1844) was an early American leader of the Primitive Baptist Church in the Southern United States and founder of numerous churches in Virginia, Kentucky, Tennessee, Illinois, and Texas. As an elder, Parker led a group which separated from that church and formed the Two-Seed-in-the-Spirit Predestinarian Baptists. Parker integrated the serpent seed doctrine into Calvinist Predestination. He connected the elect with the pure seedline, and he connected the non-elect with the serpent seedline. Parker published his beliefs in a tract which he entitled Views on the Two Seeds while he was living in Vincennes, Indiana in 1826.  Parker's seedline doctrine identified the serpent as the father of Cain and the originator of the wicked impure seedline. Parkers initially developed and promoted the serpent seedline doctrine as a key argument in his opposition to foreign Christian missionaries. Parker believed that the non-white races who were the targets of foreign missions were people who were descended from the wicked seed of the serpent. He stated that since "God would save His own children, and since the children of Satan were predestined to eternal punishment, any kind of mission plan would seem ridiculous." Parker was labeled a heretic for teaching the doctrine by mainstream Baptists. The influences on Parker's beliefs are unknown, so he may have arrived at his version of the serpent seedline doctrine independently, or he may have been influenced by early British Israel teachings. Parker's teachings coincided with the promotion of the earliest form of Polygenism in the United States by the Kentuckian Charles Caldwell, who believed non-white races could not have descended from Adam. Although it was not widely accepted, Parker's teaching became well known among Calvinistic Baptists in Kentucky. "Two-Seed Predestinarian Baptists always remained a small group. The U.S. religious census of 1906 recorded 781 members. In 1938 there were 98 members."

In the 1890s, C. A. L. Totten (1851–1908), a former professor of military science at Yale University, began to promote British Israelism. Totten began to promote the belief that Anglo-Saxons were destined by God to rule the world. Also during the 1890s, British Israelism began to develop into a formal organization which took on racial overtones. In 1886, the growing group formed the Anglo-Israel Association and in 1919, this group renamed itself the British-Israel-World Federation. The primary aim of this group was the promotion of archeological expeditions which it wished to undertake in order to discover pieces of evidence which would validate its beliefs. The group remained small, but it gained a broader base of international appeal when it began to accept all people of Germanic descent as part of the righteous seed-line of the lost tribes of Israel. By the 1930s, the movement had grown to include over 50 branches in the United States which were all under the leadership of William J. Cameron, but the British Israel movement largely faded from view both during and after World War II.

Most modern versions of the serpent seed teaching can be traced to Totten and the seedline teachings which he promoted during the early 20th century. Totten published several books and integrated British Israel theology into Adventist theology. According to Professor Jon F. Schamber, Totten's works "inspired dozens of evangelists and religious writers, including Rev. John H. Allen, a founding minister in the Church of God (Holiness); Charles Fox Parham (1873–1929), the founder of the Pentecostal Apostolic Faith Movement; Victor Morris Tyler, a wealthy industrialist and an editor of the Our Race Quarterly; Rev. Reuben H. Sawyer, a clergyman in the Christian Church and a recruiter for the Ku Klux Klan; and Alan A. Beauchamp, a publisher and an editor of the Watchman of Israel."

Christian Identity theology and white supremacy

Rev. Russel Kelso Carter (1849–1928) was a prominent Church of God (Holiness) minister and a follower of Totten. He became the first preacher of British Israelism to offer a theory on the origin of the serpent's seedline. Carter theorized that Cain was the literal Son of the serpent in his book The Tree of Knowledge which he published in 1894. Carter believed that "the tremendous pull of the sexual appetite, aroused by the excited state of the woman" caused humanity's fall in the Garden of Eden. He believed that Satan used the seduction of Eve to destroy God's pure race "at its fountainhead". Carter stopped short of speculating on who the descendants of Cain might be, but he connected the righteous seedline with the Anglo-Saxons. Carter's teachings on the subject were subsequently integrated into the overall teachings of British Israelism and they proved to be particularly appealing to members of the Ku Klux Klan and other white supremacists who spread the teaching during the 20th century.

Carter's theory was very similar to the theory which was first proposed by Daniel Parker, who may have been an influence on him. Carter may have also been influenced by the pre-Adamite and Polygenist theories which were being promoted in the United States during the 19th century. In 1875, A. Lester Hoyle wrote a book titled The Pre-Adamite, or who tempted Eve? In his book, he claimed that multiple creations of races had occurred, but he claimed that only the white race, of which Adam was the father, had been made in God's image and likeness. Hoyle also suggested that Cain was the "mongrel offspring" of Eve's seduction by "an enticing Mongolian" with whom she had repeated trysts, thus laying the foundation for the white supremacist bio-theology which states that miscegenation is "an abomination". Blending contemporary evolutionary thinking with pre-Adamism, the Vanderbilt University theistic evolutionist and geologist Alexander Winchell argued in his 1878 tract, Adamites and Preadamites, for the pre-Adamic origins of the human race, that Negroes were too racially inferior to be the descendants of the Biblical Adam.

According to Professor Jon Schamber, Rev. Philip E. J. Monson began to separate from traditional British Israelism and develop Christian Identity Theology. During the 1920s, Monson published Satan's Seat: The Enemy of Our Race in which he adopted Carter's theory on the origin of the impure seedline and combined it with anti-Catholicism.  Monson connected the work of the impure seedline to the activities of the Catholic Church and the Pope. Monson's ideas were popular among white supremacist organizations in the United States. Rev. Wesley A. Swift (1913–1970), a minister and a former recruiter for the Ku Klux Klan, and a follower of Monson, accepted the serpent seed doctrine and Christian Identity Theology and was instrumental in promoting the teachings among white supremacists in the United States.

Swift was a minister at the Angelus Temple, a church frequently visited by William Branham. Swift later separated and started a new church, Church of Jesus Christ - Christian, which was later renamed Aryan Nations by Swift's successor, Richard Girnt Butler. Swift ordained several ministers who helped him to spread the theology. His lieutenants who helped him to spread the serpent seed teaching included two Nazis, Oren Potito and Neuman Britton, and the prominent KKK leader Connie Lynch. Swift and his fellow white supremacists began to promote the doctrine even more heavily during the desegregation period of the 1950s and 1960s. According to Swift, the descendants of the serpent were "in violation of Divine law when they started to mutate species and mix races." The serpent seed teaching was used to justify racial segregation and the prohibition of interracial marriage.

It was also during the desegregation period when William Branham (1909–1965) and Arnold Murray (1929–2014) first began to promote their versions of the serpent seed doctrine. Branham was the most successful promoter of the serpent seed doctrine, and his version of it was subsequently accepted by millions of his followers. During the desegregation era, a militant form of the doctrine was espoused, especially by Christian Identity groups, because its millennial teachings state that the pure race will wage a final battle with the evil descendants of the serpent in order to destroy them.

Butler continued to promote the serpent seed doctrine throughout his life, and it continued to be prominently featured at annual Aryan Nations World Congress meetings into the 1980s and 1990s. Butler's teachings on the subject influenced the Christian Defense League, the American Nazi Party, the Christian Vanguard, David Duke and modern KKK organizations.

Modern adherents

William Branham

William M. Branham (1909–1965), a prominent American Pentecostal minister in the 1940s and 1950s who had links to the KKK, also promoted the serpent seed doctrine. Branham taught the belief that the serpent had sexual intercourse with Eve and their offspring was Cain. Branham also taught the belief that Cain's modern descendants were masquerading as educated people and scientists, along with the belief that Cain's descendants were "a big religious bunch of illegitimate bastard children" who comprised the majority of society's criminals. He believed that the serpent was the missing link between the chimpanzee and man, and he also speculated that the serpent was possibly a human-like giant. Branham believed that the serpent was transformed into a reptile after it was cursed by God.

According to Steven Hassan, "Branham’s sermons lay the foundation to believe that black people are the inferior race." Branham used the term "hybrid" to describe anything he believed to be tainted by the serpent. Branham accused Eve of producing a "hybrid" race, and he provided a way to trace the hybrid line of the Serpent's Seed to Africans and Jews through Ham the biblical progenitor of the African peoples, King Ahab, Judas Iscariot, Roman Catholics, and the future Antichrist.

Michael Barkun wrote that Branham was the most significant proponent of the racial teaching outside of the Christian Identity movement and directly influenced their theology. Branham's teachings on serpent seed was particularly significant to the development of Identity’s view of the Jews as the seed of the Devil through Cain. Branham's 1958 introduction of serpent seed teaching coincided with Wesley Swift's introduction of demonic origin of the Jews through the serpent the same year.

Branham related a story in which he privately discussed the belief that blacks were descended from apes as early as 1929. Branham publicly hinted his belief in the serpent seed doctrine as early as 1953. He first began to teach serpent seed in 1958 at the height of racial unrest in the United States. Prof. Douglas Weaver believed that Branham may have become acquainted with the serpent seed doctrine through his Baptist roots. Branham was baptized and ordained at a First Pentecostal Baptist Church which was pastored by Roy Davis, a founding member and later Imperial Wizard of the second Ku Klux Klan. Branham may also have made contact with Kentucky churches which espoused Daniel Parker's two-seed doctrine. Professor Jon Schambers also reviewed Branham's serpent seed teachings and the role which he played in spreading the doctrine. Schambers also connected Branham's serpent seed doctrine to Russel Carter's teachings which were integrated into Christian Identity Theology and Daniel Parker's Two-Seed Theology. The CBC connected William Branham to the Ku Klux Klan during a 2017 investigation. Branham's embrace of the serpent seed doctrine alienated most of the members of his Pentecostal audience. According to Pearry Green, adherents of the broader Pentecostal movement consider Branham's version of the serpent seed doctrine repugnant and in their point of view, it was the "filthy doctrine ... that ruined his ministry." No other mainstream Christian group held a similar view; Branham was widely criticized for spreading the doctrine, but his followers view the doctrine as one of his greatest revelations.

There are millions of adherents of William Branham's serpent seed teachings. Voice of God Recordings reported that about two million people subscribe to Branham's teachings through the William Branham Evangelical Association. His followers continue to promote the doctrine and as a result, they have made international news for their racial views in connection to the teaching. According to Weaver, Branham's followers are very proud of his serpent seed teaching, believing it to be "his most original revelation". Many of his followers are unaware of the doctrine's true origin. When confronted with the accusations of racism, some of his followers have denied the teaching of serpent seed has any connection to white supremacy or racism. According to  the Southern Poverty Law Center, "Not all Branham churches are racist or embrace the anti-race-mixing position," "but the theology clearly invites racism."

In 2014, Pastor Donny Reagan made news in the United States for promoting Branham's racial teachings. Several news outlets labeled Reagan as the "most racist pastor in America." Kacou Philippe, a leader of Branham's followers in Africa, was arrested in 2017 for hate speech and sentenced to one year prison after preaching in multiple African nations that blacks should be submissive towards whites. Philippe insisted decolonization of Africa was a sin, and that Africans could only prosper when in servitude to Europeans.

Arnold Murray
Televangelist Arnold Murray (1929–2014), founder of The Shepherd's Chapel and a prominent televangelist, taught the serpent seed doctrine. He accepted the belief that the Jews (Kingdom of Judah) were descended from Adam through Seth, as the Bible describes. However, he held the view that the Kenites were the offspring of Cain. He also believed that they infiltrated the northern Kingdom of Israel. Murray's teachings are disputed by Protestant apologetics ministries CARM and the CRI.

According to Southern Poverty Law,  Murray was ordained a minister in 1958 by Roy Gillaspie and Kenneth Goff, two members of the KKK and early preachers of Christian Identity. Until at least 1978, Murray served as a leader in Gillaspie's Church of Jesus Christ organization, which had been founded by Wesley Swift. Murray was also connected to Goff's Soldiers of the Cross Training Institute where Christian Identity was taught. Dan Gayman, the most prominent Christian Identity Leader in the 1980s, attended the institute.

Explaining his beliefs in a 1979 Shepherd's Bible, Murray explained that the Kenites were serpent's offspring who "slipped in among the Jewish people in Jerusalem and claim to be God's chosen people, when in fact they are of Lucifer." Connecting the Kennites to the modern Jewish people, Murray explained that "in 1967 … Jerusalem fell to the Kenites during the 6 day war".  In another sermon, Murray said that the Kenites "are responsible for the slaying of Christ." Although his teachings portrayed Jews as descendants of Lucifer, Murray insisted that his beliefs were not anti-semitic.

Christian Identity movement

Adherents of the white supremacist theology which is known as two-seedline Christian Identity do not believe that the Jews are the chosen people of God because in their view, only white people are the descendants of Adam and hence the chosen people of God. According to their belief, members of all other races are descended from Cain and are thus descended from Satan, especially Jews and Blacks. This belief was popularized by Wesley A. Swift (Church of Jesus Christ–Christian), Conrad Gaard, Dan Gayman (Church of Israel) and William Potter Gale among others. The opposing faction is called One-Seedline Christian Identity because its adherents hold the view that all people are descended from Adam, but they believe that only Aryans (meaning Northern Europeans) are God's chosen people. Christian Identity followers "believe that they are in or are about to enter into the time of the Tribulation, a great battle between good and evil in which they will take part."

Groups which adhere to Christian Identity theology include Aryan Nations, the Christian Defense League, and the Ku Klux Klan. In 2000, the Southern Poverty Law Center estimated that there were 50,000 adherents of Christian Identity theology in the United States.

Unification Church

The Unification Church has taught a version of the serpent seed doctrine since at least 1961. Sun Myung Moon taught that the Fall of Man occurred when Eve was sexually seduced by Satan, and since then, the human bloodline has been contaminated. Moon believed that both Cain and Abel were physically descended from Adam and Eve, but taught that "Cain is in the position of Satan's son". Moon referred to secular society and religious people outside of the Unification Church as "Cain people". Members of the Unification Church believe that through their Holy Marriage Blessing Ceremony, married couples are removed from the lineage of Adam and Eve and grafted into God's sinless lineage as the adopted children of their new Adam: Sun Myung Moon. The first of these ceremonies occurred in 1961.

In World Scripture the Unification Church uses excerpts from  the Koran, the Midrash Rabbah, the Bahir, the Stromata and Sigmund Freud to support their interpretation. Moon attended many different Christian churches during the 1930s and 1940s in both Korea and Japan, and was exposed to British missionaries and Pentecostals. He may have been exposed to seedline teachings during this period.

P'ikareum is a related ritual which is performed by members of several Korean new religious movements, in which a female devotee has sex with the male leader (who claims to be the messiah) in order to purify her descendants from inherited sin. The purpose of this ritual is to undo the original sin, which (as in the classic serpent seed doctrine) was believed to have been committed when Eve had sex with the serpent. British religious scholar George Chryssides also noted that there were cases in which the messianic leader was a female and the neophyte was a male. The person who is so initiated will then have intercourse with his or her spouse, and the purity which is acquired from the messianic leader will be transmitted to both the spouse and the spouse's progeny. The most notable Korean new religious movement to have faced allegations of performing p'ikareum is the early Unification Church of Sun Myung Moon; however, Chryssides notes that, aside from the use of language which involves the purifying of sinful bloodlines, there is no actual evidence that this ritual occurs within the Unification movement.

QAnon
Ideas which are similar to the serpent seed doctrine have also been embraced by some believers in the QAnon conspiracy theory. An example of this is the case of Matthew Taylor Coleman, a California surfing instructor who said that he killed his two young children with a spear fishing gun because he believed that they had inherited "serpent DNA" from their mother and would eventually turn into monsters.

See also
 Antisemitism in Christianity
 Curse and mark of Cain
 Curse of Ham
 Khazar hypothesis of Ashkenazi ancestry
 Ophites
 Polygenism
 Pre-Adamite
 Religious antisemitism
 Reptilian conspiracy theory

References

Sources
 

 
 

 

Christianity and antisemitism
Branhamism
Christian Identity
Christian mythology
Christian terminology
Christian theology of the Bible
Gnosticism
Heresy in Christianity
Kabbalah
Kabbalistic words and phrases
Protestant theology
Unification Church beliefs
Religious concepts related with Adam and Eve
Snakes in religion